John Leonard (born 1965) is an Australian poet.

He was born in the UK, and from 1984 to 1987 studied at the University of Oxford. In 1991 he moved to Australia. He currently lives in Canberra, Australia, and was poetry editor of the quarterly Overland from 2003 to 2007. In 2020 he was a juror for the Montreal International Poetry Prize.

Works
Poetry
 Unlove (1991)
 100 Elegies for Modernity (1997)
 Jesus in Kashmir (2003)
 Braided Lands (2010)
 A Spell, A Charm (2014)
 Think of the world: Collected Poems 1986-2016 (2016)
 Wordfall (2019)

Criticism
 The Way of Poetry (Three Pines Press)

History
 The Reawakening: Religion and the Future of Humanity (2015) 
 The True History of Pocahontas (2015)

References

External links
Author website
Interview with author

1965 births
Living people
Australian poets